State Road 114 (SR 114) is a  state highway that travels entirely within the city limits of Jacksonville. It is known as 8th Street for its entire length, which is exclusively in the Hogan's Creek neighborhood.

Route description
It starts at the intersection of Francis and 8th Streets, heading east on 8th Street.  There is an interchange with Interstate 95  from the route's beginning.  It passes through the UF Health Jacksonville complex, bisecting its campus, and ends shortly thereafter just beyond Boulevard.  The thoroughfare continues for several miles as 8th Street.

Major intersections

References

114
114
114
State highways in the United States shorter than one mile